Fusiturricula humerosa is a species of sea snail, a marine gastropod mollusk in the family Drilliidae.

Description
The size of an adult shell varies between 19 mm and 47 mm.

Distribution
This species occurs in the demersal zone of the Caribbean Sea off Jamaica and Venezuela

It has also been found as a fossil in Miocene to Pliocene strata of the Gurabo Formation (Dominican Republic); age range: 7.246 to 3.6 Ma

References

 Gabb, William M. On the topography and geology of Santo Domingo. M'Calla & Stavely, printers, 1873.

External links
 

humerosa
Gastropods described in 1873